Xenon-enhanced CT scanning is a method of computed tomography (CT scanning) used for neuroimaging in which the subject inhales xenon gas while CT images are made.   The method can be used to assess changes in cerebral blood flow in the period shortly after a traumatic brain injury, or to detect or indicate the location of a stroke. Xenon acts as a contrast medium and the saturation of brain tissue is proportional to blood flow. This allows the estimation of blood flow to any given brain area based on imaging results.

References

Neurotrauma
X-ray computed tomography